The Hosu is a left tributary of the river Fizeș in Romania. It flows into the Fizeș near Gherla.

References

Rivers of Romania
Rivers of Cluj County